BEAM is the virtual machine at the core of the Erlang Open Telecom Platform (OTP). BEAM is part of the Erlang Run-Time System (ERTS), which compiles Erlang source code into bytecode, which is then executed on the BEAM. BEAM bytecode files have the .beam file extension.

Originally BEAM was short for Bogdan's Erlang Abstract Machine, named after Bogumil "Bogdan" Hausman, who wrote the original version, but the name may also be referred to as Björn's Erlang Abstract Machine, after Björn Gustavsson, who wrote and maintains the current version. Both developers worked on the system while at Ericsson.

The predecessor of the BEAM was JAM (Joe's Abstract Machine), which was the first virtual machine for the Erlang language and was written by Joe Armstrong.

See also 
 Comparison of application virtual machines
 Register machine

References

External links
 Erlang website
 A History of Erlang
 The Erlang BEAM Virtual Machine Specification, 1997
 The BEAM Book by Erik Stenman

Erlang (programming language)
Programming language implementation
Register-based virtual machines